Diego Lopez (born January 6, 2002) is an American soccer player.

Career 
Lopez played with FC Golden State in California, before moving to sign his first professional contract with United Soccer League side Atlanta United 2. On September 20, 2019, Lopez and the club parted ways by mutual agreement.

On September 24, 2019, Lopez joined USL Championship side Orange County SC.

References

External links 
 FC Golden State Profile
 

2002 births
Living people
American soccer players
Association football forwards
Atlanta United 2 players
Orange County SC players
People from Chino, California
Soccer players from California
Sportspeople from San Bernardino County, California
USL Championship players